Christoffel Frederik "Frikkie" Eloff SC (31 January 1925 – 10 December 2017) was a South African judge who served as Judge President of the Transvaal Provincial Division of the Supreme Court of South Africa from 1991 until 1998.

Early life and education
Eloff, was born in Pretoria in 1925 and was taken to England at a young age, where he attended boarding school in Bexhill. He returned to South Africa and matriculated in Pretoria in 1941. After school he started studying part-time at the University of Pretoria and obtained his BA and LLB degrees.

Career

Eloff was admitted as an advocate and called to the Pretoria Bar at the age of 22 in 1947. He took silk in 1965 and was first appointed as an acting judge in 1967. In 1973 he became a permanent judge at Transvaal Provincial Division of the Supreme Court of South Africa. He served as an acting judge of appeal during 1984 and in 1985, he became Deputy Judge President of the Transvaal Provincial Division. In 1991 he was appointed the Judge President of the Transvaal Division, a post he had held until 1998.

Notable cases
In 1996, Eloff was the presiding judge in the divorce trial of Nelson Mandela and Winnie Madikizela-Mandela. A few years earlier he was the judge in the Chris Hani murder trial. He sentenced both Janusz Waluś and Clive Derby-Lewis to death, the sentences were later commuted to a life in prison.

Honours and awards
The University of Pretoria conferred an honorary LLD upon Eloff in 1996 and in the same year, he was appointed as the President of the Convocation of the university. In 2007, Eloff was honoured with a statue at the Palace of Justice in Pretoria.

See also
List of Judges President of the Gauteng Division of the High Court of South Africa

References

1925 births
2017 deaths
South African judges
University of Pretoria alumni